Wakil Ahmed is a Bangladeshi academic who served as the vice-chancellor of Bangladesh National University from July 2005 until December 2007. He is the former president of the Bangla Academy and the Asiatic Society of Bangladesh. He was awarded Ekushey Padak in 2004 by the Government of Bangladesh for his research contribution.

Career
Ahmed was appointed as the vice-chancellor of Bangladesh National University in July 2005. In December 2007, he was removed from the office.

As of 2010, Ahmed served as a supernumerary professor of the Department of Bangla at the University of Dhaka.

References 

Living people
Academic staff of the University of Dhaka
Recipients of the Ekushey Padak
Year of birth missing (living people)
Place of birth missing (living people)
Vice-Chancellors of National University Bangladesh